Lázaro Salazar Vázquez (February 4, 1912 – April 25, 1957) was a Cuban baseball outfielder,  pitcher, and manager in the Negro leagues and the Mexican League. He played from 1924 to 1952 with several clubs, including the Cuban Stars (West), Pollock's Cuban Stars, New York Cubans, Cafeteros de Córdoba, Azules de Veracruz, Industriales de Monterrey and Sultanes de Monterrey.

Salazar also played and managed in Venezuela for a long time. While pitching for the Gavilanes team, he was part of the longest contest in Venezuelan baseball history in a 20-inning game that lasted 6 hours, 20 minutes, losing a pitching duel to Andrés Julio Báez [Grillo B] and the Pastora team, 1–0 (Maracaibo, May 5, 1938).

He later managed the Navegantes del Magallanes of the Venezuelan Professional Baseball League during seven consecutive seasons from 1949 through 1956, leading the squad to championship titles in the 1949–1950, 1950–1951, 1951–1952 and 1954–1955 campaigns.

Salazar was enshrined in the Cuban Baseball Hall of Fame in 1954. He also gained inductions into the Mexican Professional Baseball Hall of Fame in 1964 and the Venezuelan Baseball Hall of Fame and Museum in 2010.

References

External links
 and Seamheads
Venezuelan Winter League batting and pitching statistics

1912 births
1957 deaths
Baseball players from Havana
Azules de Veracruz players
Cafeteros de Córdoba players
Caribbean Series managers
Cuban Stars (West) players
Industriales de Monterrey players
Leopardos de Santa Clara players
Mexican Baseball Hall of Fame inductees
Mexican League baseball managers
Minor league baseball managers
Navegantes del Magallanes players
Cuban expatriate baseball players in Venezuela
New York Cubans players
Sultanes de Monterrey players
Pollock's Cuban Stars players
Cuban expatriate baseball players in Mexico